This is a list of diplomatic missions in Laos.  At present, the capital city of Vientiane hosts 25 embassies. Several other countries have missions resident in other regional capitals.

Missions in Vientiane

Embassies

Other missions
 (Office of the Embassy)
 (Embassy office)

Consulates-General

Luang Prabang

Pakse

Savannakhet City

Accredited embassies 
Unless otherwise noted, missions are resident in Bangkok

 (Beijing)
 (Hanoi)
 (Hanoi)
 (Hanoi)

 (New York City)
 (Hanoi)

 (Beijing)

 (Beijing)

 (Beijing)
 (New York City)

 (Hanoi)
 (New York City)
 (New York City)
 (Delegation)
 (Hanoi)
 (Stockholm)
 (Beijing)
 (Seoul)
 (Hanoi)
 (Tokyo)

 (Beijing)
 (Kuala Lumpur)
  
 (Hanoi)
 (Hanoi)
 (Taipei)
 (Beijing)

 (Hanoi)
 (Hanoi)
 (Hanoi)

 (Beijing)

 (Beijing)
 (Stockholm)
 (New York City)
 (Berlin)
 (Hanoi)
 (Stockholm)

  
 (New York City)
 (Beijing)
 (New York City)
 (New York City)

 (Moscow)
 (Paris)
 (New York City)

 (Hanoi)

 (Hanoi)

 (Hanoi)
 (Tokyo)

 (Jakarta)

 (Hanoi)
 (Seoul)
 (New Delhi)
 (New Delhi)
 (Yangon)
 (Beijing)

 (Beijing)

 (Hanoi)

 (Jakarta)
 (Beijing)
 (Hanoi)
 (New Delhi)
 (Beijing)
 (Beijing)
 (Kuala Lumpur)
 (Moscow)
 (Beijing)
 (Moscow)
 (Hanoi)
 (Beijing)
 (Hanoi)
 (Hanoi)
 (Beijing)
 (Hanoi)
 (Beijing)
 (Kuala Lumpur)
 (New York City)

Closed missions

Notes

See also 
 Foreign relations of Laos
 List of diplomatic missions of Laos
 Visa policy of Laos
 Visa requirements for Laotian citizens
 1987 Vientiane bombing

References

External links
 Diplomatic missions in the Lao P.D.R.
 List of Consulates in Lao P.D.R.

Diplomatic missions
Laos
Diplomatic missions